The Adventures of Rocky and Bullwinkle may refer to:

Television and film
The Adventures of Rocky and Bullwinkle and Friends, an American animated television series 1959–1964
The Adventures of Rocky and Bullwinkle (film), a 2000 American film based on the TV series
The Adventures of Rocky and Bullwinkle (TV series), a 2018 American animated web television series, a reboot of the original

Other uses
The Adventures of Rocky and Bullwinkle and Friends (video game), 1992
The Adventures of Rocky and Bullwinkle Show, a former Universal Studios Florida attraction
The Adventures of Rocky and Bullwinkle and Friends (pinball), a 1993 pinball game released by Data East USA, Inc.

See also
Bullwinkle and Rocky Role-Playing Party Game, 1988
Rocky & Bullwinkle (2014 film), American computer-animated direct-to-video short film